The fourth season of The Celebrity Apprentice Australia premiered on the Nine Network on Wednesday 16 September 2015. Mark Bouris returned as CEO, while Kerri-Anne Kennerley and Shelley Barrett became the new boardroom advisors. On 21 July 2015, the cast was officially announced.

On 18 November, Sophie Monk was declared the winner of the season with the money going to her charity of choice, Make A Wish Foundation.

Candidates

Weekly results

 The candidate won the competition and was named the Celebrity Apprentice.
 The candidate won as project manager on his/her team.
 The candidate lost as project manager on his/her team.
 The candidate was on the losing team.
 The candidate was brought to the final boardroom.
 The candidate was fired.
 The candidate lost as project manager and was fired.
 The candidate quit the competition.
 The candidate was re-instated into the competition.
 The candidate was absent during this week.

Tasks

Task 1
Airdate: 16 September 2015

Task 2
Airdate: 23 September 2015

Task 3
Airdate: 30 September 2015

Task 4
Airdate: 7 October 2015

Task 5
Airdate: 14 October 2015

Task 6
Airdate: 21 October 2015

Task 7
Airdate: 28 October 2015

Task 8
Airdate: 4 November 2015

Task 9
Airdate: 11 November 2015

Final Task
Airdate : 18 November 2015

Ratings
 Colour key:
  – Highest rating during the series
  – Lowest rating during the series

References

Australia 4
2015 Australian television seasons